Brandy Station is an unincorporated community and census-designated place (CDP) in Culpeper County, Virginia, United States. It was first listed as a CDP in the 2020 census with a population of 191. Its original name was Brandy. The name Brandy Station comes from a local tavern sign that advertised brandy.

Brandy Station was the site of the 1863 Battle of Brandy Station, the largest predominantly cavalry engagement of the American Civil War as well as the largest to take place ever on American soil.

Auburn, Farley, and the Graffiti House are listed on the National Register of Historic Places.

Culpeper Regional Airport is located on Beverly Ford Road in Brandy Station.

See also
Brandy Station Foundation

Notes

Unincorporated communities in Virginia
Unincorporated communities in Culpeper County, Virginia
Journey Through Hallowed Ground National Heritage Area